Corruption in Pakistan is widespread, and extends to every sector from government to judiciary, police, health services and education. 

The problems are long-standing, and despite ongoing calls for reform, and many attempts to improve the situation, there is little evidence of progress. The former government of Pakistan Tehreek-e-Insaaf (Pakistan Justice Movement), led by cricketer turned politician Imran Khan, vowed to uproot corruption from all sectors. However, there is little success in bringing accountability across the board. The promise to build a welfare state on the principle of Riasat-e-Madina (state of Madina) has been enshrined by recent government but there is little success on practical grounds.

Brief history

The Dominion of Pakistan was created as a result of the Pakistan Movement in 1947. Upon gaining independence, Pakistan inherited a strong bureaucracy and army from the British Raj. There has since been no major change in this bureaucratic set up since it was first implemented by British, albeit reforms were proposed by the Musharraf regime in 2007. This has led many to speculate that "corruption has seeped into the higher echelons of bureaucracy" where "corruption cases are [mostly] reported against irregular and ex-cadre appointments". It was by the late 1960s that the bureaucracy started being portrayed as an "instrument of oppression". In multiple reports published by the World Bank, the Pakistani bureaucracy was seen as being rife with corruption, inefficient and bloated in size with an absence of accountability and resistant to change.

Bureaucracy and secession of East Pakistan: 1954–1971

The bureaucratic influence was strong in the western provinces of Pakistan while the eastern province retained a majority of the population. On 22 November 1954, bureaucratic administrators moved a resolution to merge the four western provinces into a single unit called West Pakistan. This led to public outcry in East Pakistan who felt that they were being misrepresented and systematically marginalised by the land-owning Punjabi Muslim elites who enjoyed higher bureaucratic positions at the time. This led to the secession of East Pakistan into the separate nation state of Bangladesh and lay witness to the corrupt malpractices of the Punjabi elite in West Pakistan. Punjabis argued that East Pakistan's majority was a consequence of the high percentage of Bengali Hindus in the province who were not involved in the state's decision-making processes. Thus, the Punjabi landowners remained largely unrepentant of their desires to "[secure] their own hegemony" leading to the loss of the eastern province in 1971.

Nationalisation politicises economic planning: 1973–1977
After Zulfikar Ali Bhutto came into power in 1973, he introduced a planned economic system to revitalise the stagnant economy. This led to the introduction of the nationalisation programme bringing entire private industrial corporations under the government ownership. In 1974, Bhutto cancelled the fourth five-year plans bypassing the recommendations of the Planning Commission, focusing entirely on broadening government control over private business enterprises. In doing so, Bhutto's government began the politicisation of economic planning.

Political interference opened doors for corrupt political practices to seep into the nation's economic planning processes. The nationalisation programme badly affected the reputation of the Pakistan Peoples Party. Accumulated losses of up to Rs 254 million were reported with several instances of over-staffing and inefficient productivity in heavy mechanical industries. By 1976, the state had been hijacked by group and individuals trying to accumulate wealth by redistributing resources from public enterprises to private individuals. Public enterprises "became a device to extend political patronage to those that the regime favoured, to pay political debts, or to accumulate power".

Denationalisation and political favouritism: 1978–1988
Bhutto's nationalisation programme lost its appeal towards the end of his government's term and the demand for denationalisation gained more currency. The successive government of military chief and president Muhammad Zia-ul-Haq released a whitepaper that led to the creation of a commission under Pakistan Industrial Credit and Investment Corporation (PICIC) to reverse earlier nationalisation efforts. Not much was achieved in this regard and only three industries, including future prime minister Nawaz Sharif's conglomerate Ittefaq Group of Industries, were ever denationalised and returned to their owners. Many argue that Sharif was favoured in this process because he was a political protégé of the military dictator at the helm.

Unprecedented political corruption: 2008–2013

In 2012, Transparency International (TI) calculated that Pakistan had lost more than Rs 8.5 trillion (US$ 94 billion) in corruption, tax evasion and bad governance in the PPP-led coalition government from 2008 to 2013. However, from 2013 to 2017, while Nawaz Sharif was in power, Transparency International indicated a significant drop in corruption as Pakistan improved from a score of 28 to 32 in the TI Corruption Perceptions Index, even though serious allegations of corruption were levelled against him during that time. In the Index, countries are scored on a scale of 0 to 100 according to how honest their public sectors are perceived to be; a high score indicates a perception of an honest public sector. Pakistan received a score of 28 in the 2021 Index, where the highest-scoring country received a score of 88 and the lowest-scoring country, 11.

Adil Gillani, an advisor for TI Pakistan, observed in 2012 that if Pakistan checked the menace of corruption and ensured good governance, it would not require a single penny from the outside world. The 2008–2013 PPP-led coalition government was criticised as being the most corrupt in the country's history. The free and powerful local media in Pakistan exposed various cases of corruption during the government's tenure including cases of bribery and corruption in government-owned enterprises like Pakistan International Airlines and Pakistan Railways.

On 29 March 2012, a civilian resident of Johar Town Lahore, Tariq Ahmed, filed a court petition in the Lahore High Court, seeking to hear the case of disqualification of prime minister Yousaf Raza Gillani. The plea was filed in the High Court in which the petitioner took the stance that "Fauzia Gillani— spouse of prime minister Gillani received loans of millions of rupees from the Agriculture Development Bank Ltd (ADB) and the National Bank of Pakistan for the two mega-corporations owned by the Gillani family of which Fauzia Gillani served both megacorporations as executive director. None of the loans of millions of rupees were paid back to the banks. When the disqualification petition was put to rest by the ruling of the Speaker of the National Assembly Dr Fehmida Mirza citing that the petition did not hold ground, Gillani was convicted on the charges of Contempt of Court. Gillani became Pakistan's first prime minister to be convicted while holding office and was later sentenced and disqualified. Gillani is prudently criticised for a prolonged era of stagflation, in which fundamental economic problems were ignored, government was mismanaged and corruption was endemic.

Anti-corruption efforts

Prevention of Corruption Acts: 1947, 1950 and 1958
The Prevention of Corruption Act, 1947 implemented in the Dominion of Pakistan was enacted to make effective provisions for the prevention of bribery and corruption of public servants, particularly in the bureaucratic administration. The autonomous Princely State of Bahawalpur adopted its own version of the act, namely the Bahawalpur Prevention of Corruption Act, 1950.

In 1955, an accord was signed between Nawab Sadeq Mohammad Khan V and Lt Gen Ghulam Muhammad Malik which made the state of Bahawalpur a part of the province of West Pakistan. This geopolitical change meant that the original act needed amendments to include Bahawalpur and other regions which were originally left out of the act. Subsequently, in October 1958, an ordinance was passed to extend the act to the whole of the province of West Pakistan – this is known as the Prevention of Corruption Act (West Pakistan Extension) Ordinance, 1958. This ordinance extended the scope of the original to the districts of Karat, Kharan, Makran and Lasbela and also repealed the Bahawalpur Prevention of Corruption Act, 1950.

National Accountability Bureau Ordinance, 1999
On 16 November 1999, Ordinance XIX was passed which later came to be known as the National Accountability Bureau Ordinance. It called for the establishment of the National Accountability Bureau (NAB) as an autonomous federal institution building efforts to combat cases of corruption, financial crimes and economic terrorism in Pakistan. According to the ordinance, NAB was granted authority to launch investigations,conduct inquiries, and issue arrest warrants against individuals suspected in financial mismanagement, terrorism, corruption in private, state, defence and corporate sectors), and direct such cases to accountability courts. Individuals convicted under the National Accountability Bureau Ordinance are prohibited from holding political office for ten years.

Provincial legislation against corruption
The provincial governments of Pakistan are responsible for legislations in their respective provinces and since 2013, there has been several legislative efforts against corruption, primarily in the provinces of Khyber Pakhtunkhwa and Punjab. Following is a list of recent anti-corruption legislations:

Khyber Pakhtunkhwa anti-corruption legislations
The Khyber Pakhtunkhwa Right to Information Bill was passed in the provincial assembly on 31 October 2013. It was enacted throughout the province by the Governor of Khyber Pakhtunkhwa on 4 November 2013 as the Khyber Pakhtunkhwa Right to Information Act, 2013. The legislation makes way for provisions that add transparency to the various functions and departments of the government. It gives the citizens of the province the right to access any information or record held by a public body, except for the information that is sensitive to the security of the state.

Role of mainstream and social media

Mainstream media
Before 2002, the electronic media was entirely dominated by state-owned institutions like Pakistan Television Corporation and Pakistan Broadcasting Corporation. This monopoly was thwarted, when the Musharraf regime regulated the electronic media allowing for private television channels to be operated independently. Since the liberalisation of the electronic media in 2002, it has served as a major force in exposing corruption-related cases and scams.

Following are a few of the major corruption scams and scandals reported and exposed in the mainstream Pakistani media:
 Rental Power Projects (RPP) scam: In 2006, the media reported on a case involving several instances of bribery in the Rental Power Projects (RPP) where top-level ministers were involved. Former prime minister Raja Pervez Ashraf was also allegedly involved in these cases of corruption but was later cleared by the NAB. His involvement in this case earned him the nickname "Raja Rental".
 PMDC fake registrations: In 2010, Dr Ahmad Nadeem Akbar, Registrar of the Pakistan Medical and Dental Council had cancelled fake registrations done by some PM&DC officials and had dismissed them from service as they were found to issuing fake registration of medical professionals, allowing for inexperienced personnel to take up important positions in medicine and play with lives of public.The Islamabad High Court in July 2014 and earlier the Supreme Court had upheld his actions and have ordered high power inquiries by NAB in this regard against culprits nominated by Dr Ahmad Nadeem Akbar Once this negligence was reported in the media, the Anti-corruption and Crime Wing of the Federal Investigation Agency took action and identified fake registrations for 40 doctors and 19 medical colleges. The case of registration of 19 medical colleges in one day was investigated by Honourable Justice Shabbar Raza Rizvi and report points towards corruption by the PM&DC Executive Committee member Dr Asim Hussain and Prof Massod Hameed Khan and the employees of the Federal Ministry. As of 2013, FIA had identified about 150 probable instances of fake registrations.
 Mismanagement of state-owned institutions: Pakistan's flagship airline Pakistan International Airlines (PIA) was reported to have been mismanagement by the executive authorities giving rise to a corrupt culture of bribery. Corruption in PIA led to losses of around US$ 500 million. Similarly, massive financial losses were reported for Pakistan Railways caused by embezzlement.
 Hajj corruption case: Media reported on an ongoing corruption scandal involving federal ministers extorting illegal payouts from travel agents involved in fleecing Hajj pilgrims to Saudi Arabia. The Minister of Science and Technology, Azam Khan Swati, identified and named the Minister of Religious Affairs, Hamid Saeed Kazmi, as being responsible for giving out these illegal orders. He revealed that he had already warned the prime minister about the scandal thereby making several leading members of the parliament accessory to these criminal offences.
 OGRA scam: One Adnan Khwaja brother-in-law of PPP Secretary-General Punjab was appointed as Chairman who was instrumental in the scam. The OGRA scam case is sub-judice and the ex-Chairman is being prosecuted but at snails's pace.
 NATO containers case: Media reported on 40 NATO containers that went missing on their way to the International Security Assistance Force (ISAF) in Afghanistan. It was later identified that the missing containers carried cargo that was considered contraband in Pakistan, including liquor to be sold in Pakistan.
 Pakistan Steel Mills scam: The mainstream media reported a major scam in the Pakistan Steel Mills involving Rs 26.5 billion. Once the scam was reported, the FIA initially took action but their progress turned sluggish due to which the Supreme Court issued a contempt of court notice to the interior minister Rehman Malik for hindering and interfering with the investigation.
 NICL corruption case: The National Insurance Company Limited scandal was first reported in the media in 2012 involving the purchase of 10 acres of land in Karachi by the company at "an exorbitant price" and the transfer of millions of rupees from the account of Zafar Salim, a cousin of the land seller Khwaja Akbar Butt into the joint accounts of Makhdoom Muhammad Ameen Faheem, his wife and his son.
 Ephedrine quota case: The Ephedrine quote case was a scandal involving prime minister Yousaf Raza Gillani's son, Ali Musa Gillani, who pressure officials of the Ministry of Health into allocating a quota (worth Rs 70 billion) of controlled chemical ephedrine to two different Multan-based pharmaceutical companies.
 The mediagate scandal: It was reported that Chief Justice of Pakistan Iftikhar Muhammad Chaudhry's son had allegedly taken money from Malik Riaz Hussain, a real-estate tycoon, to persuade courts to give decisions in favour of the latter. Renowned columnist and anchorperson Javed Chaudhry observed that the case against Malik Riaz proved that the media can hold itself and the judiciary accountable. He further added that this case along with the case for missing persons effectively establish the credibility and impartiality of media's fight against corruption.

Social media
In the wake of 2013 elections, massive electoral rigging was alleged through first-hand accounts of several members of the public via social networking websites. Specialised websites were set up to publish and archive material exposing corrupt malpractices throughout the many polling stations serving several constituencies, e.g., dhandli.com. Several leaked videos of persons supposed to be caught in the act of rigging the polls went viral and caught the eye of the mainstream media becoming topics of discussion in days to follow. However, a judicial probe found these allegations to be unsubstantiated. Even before the elections, social media served as an effective tool to hold the nation's to-be-leaders "accountable" for various issues like corruption and education.

Citizen journalism is emerging as a growing phenomenon and social media is being touted in Pakistan as an important tool that can be used to strengthen democracy. Adding to the mix, several prominent politicians have moved to the likes of Twitter to gather support and get prospective voters on board and analysts think that this can lead to a better and direct accountability of political leaders. Social media has also proved effective in identifying corruption in mainstream media, particularly in the case of the mediagate scandal.

A lot of positives can be derived from social media and its effects on Pakistan. But it is not without its problems. Lack of legislation and implementation of defamation laws has allowed propaganda against certain people particularly politicians to go unchecked. How to prevent such elements in social media without infringing on freedom of expression should be a topic of debate for legislators in the future.

Corruption by sector

Judiciary

In 2002, in a report titled "Nature and Extent of Corruption in the Public Sector", Transparency International (TI) Pakistan reported that the highest amounts of bribery were spent on people affiliated with the judiciary. Later in 2010, TI Pakistan presented a breakdown of the various actors in the judicial system involved in corruption. A majority of the participants reported that they, or someone in their household, has been subjected to an act of corruption while interacting with someone from the judiciary. When asked of the actors involved, 33.62% people said court employees, 23.73% said public prosecutors, 14.12% said witnesses, 12.43% said judges, 8.19% said opponent lawyer, 4.52% said magistrates while 3.39% mentioned others.

In a 2011 survey, TI Pakistan identified judiciary as the most corrupt institution in Pakistan alongside police. Nevertheless, with the proceedings of some high-impact corruption cases against government officials, including the prime minister, the Supreme Court demonstrated its positive role in tackling corruption. Where the apex court was being hailed for its anti-corruption efforts in 2013, Mehmoodul Hassan, a member of the Sindh Bar Council, alleged that nepotism and corruption were still "rampant" in the lower judiciary, particularly high courts and the lower courts, where people were unlawfully promoted within the judiciary.

Education

In the 2010, TI Pakistan reported that about 23.7% of those surveyed received admission in educational institutions through non-normal and alternate procedures. One of the biggest problems identified in the country is the presence of a non-uniform educational system. The private sector actively encourages western educational models such as the General Certificate of Secondary Education using this to justify unaffordable fees they charge ordinary citizens. Finding gain in such enterprises, the elite class amongst politicians, technocrats, bureaucrats and businessmen usually capitalise in this venture. These attitudes can also explain the deteriorating standards in the public sector educational institutes. On the other hand, state-owned public schools face several challenges including poor management and governance, and incompetence of consecutive governments in the education sector. Further factors for failing standards in state-run institutions include lack of funding, non-utilisation by elite classes, appointments of under-qualified faculty.

For a brief time during the regime of Pervez Musharraf, Pakistan received unprecedented investments in its higher-education sector – this funding faltered with the arrival of Zardari's government after 2008. In 2011, Dr Syed Abdul Aziz, director of Hamdard Institute of Education and Social Sciences declared education as one of the most corrupt sectors in Pakistan. According to 2013 findings by Transparency International, factor that contribute to this corrupt culture in the sector include embezzlement of development funds allocated by the government, thousands of ghost schools that appear only on paper, bribes taken to sell confidential material to candidates, poor or under-utilisation of funds and an inertia to change on the behalf of the education ministry.

Health care

In 2010, 42% of surveyed individuals reported gaining access to hospital services by a method other than standard admission, and 48% reported either having to pay additional costs for essential services or being forced to utilize the services of a designated affiliate. Of the respondents who were asked to identify which parties orchestrated the corrupt acts, 61% reported hospital staff, 25% reported doctors, and 13% reported nurses.

Police and law enforcement

Corruption is found to be commonplace in the lower levels of police. Police was observed as the most corrupt sector in a 2013 survey by Transparency International (TI). This situation has persisted since the graft watchdog's July 2010 survey, in which it was noted that the major cause for corruption in this sector was due to a lack of accountability and merit, and low salaries. Payment of bribes in order to escape and avoid charges was also commonplace; 31% of 4,224 respondents reported paying bribes to the police. Citizen journalists upload instances of police officials taking bribes on social networking and video sharing websites like YouTube.

Ordinary citizens face challenges in reporting instances of corruption they encounter with the police. In 2005, Prime Minister Shaukat Aziz ordered an investigation into claims by a 23-year-old woman who alleged that, in retaliation for attempting to reveal police corruption, police falsely detained her for fifteen days and raped her.

Public utilities

As of 2002, 96% of surveyed individuals reported corruption issues with electrical utility officials during the past year. The most common types of corruption were billing related. Some consumers admitted to illegally reducing their utility bills, while others reported being harassed with inflated bills intended to solicit bribes. Out of the pool of corruption-affirmative respondents, 71% reported that money was "demanded directly by the actor".

Sports corruption

In August 2010, reporters from News of the World orchestrated a sting operation which was able to identify three Pakistani cricket players – Salman Butt, Mohammad Asif and Mohammad Amir – and a bookmaker Mazhar Majeed of being complicit in a row over spot-fixing in the fourth England-Pakistan test match at Lord's. The cricketers each received 30 months, one year and six months jail term respectively while the bookmaker received two years and eight months jail term in a verdict issued by the Southwark Crown Court on November 3, 2011. Following these events, on 15 November 2011, the chairman of the Pakistan Cricket Board, Zaka Ashraf established an anti-corruption unit to prevent players from becoming involved in illegal betting practices. The cricket board has introduced new anti-corruption laws in order to bring accountability among cricketers and board officials.

Taxation

According to the 2002 study, 99% of 256 respondents reported facing corruption of taxation. Furthermore, 32% of respondents reported paying bribes to have their tax assessment lowered, and nearly 14% reported receiving fictitious tax assessments until a bribe was paid.

See also
 Corruption charges against Benazir Bhutto and Asif Ali Zardari
 Mediagate scandal
 National Accountability Bureau
Nationalisation in Pakistan
 Pakistan cricket spot-fixing scandal
 Periods of stagflation in Pakistan
 Privatisation in Pakistan

Further reading

Citations

References

External links
 Corruption in Pakistan at Transparency International–Pakistan
 The Problem of Corruption in Pakistan
 Pakistan Corruption Profile from the Business Anti-Corruption Portal
Two Pakistani politicians have joined the list of ten most corrupt politicians in the world

 
Society of Pakistan
Pakistan